That article shows the list and details of the managers in their spells at Colo-Colo.

Chronology
The letter c means Caretaker manager.

Most successful managers
The following table, shows the most successful managers according to the club's history (totals include competitive matches only):

Table correct as of 12 March 2013

 (*): International tournament runner-up.

Colo-Colo managers, List of
Colo-Colo